Earth Surface Dynamics is a peer-reviewed open access scientific journal published by Copernicus Publications on behalf of the European Geosciences Union. It covers Earth-surface processes, including geomorphology, whether physical, chemical, or biological. The editor-in-chief is Tom Coulthard (University of Hull). As of 18 June 2015, it has been accepted by Thompson-Reuters to be indexed in the Science Citation Index Expanded, the Journal Citation Reports, and Current Contents/Physical Chemical and Earth Sciences.

See also 
List of scientific journals in earth and atmospheric sciences

References

External links 
 

Geology journals
Geomorphology journals
Publications established in 2013
English-language journals
European Geosciences Union academic journals
Copernicus Publications academic journals
Creative Commons Attribution-licensed journals